The 2017 season was AIK's 126th in existence, their 89th season in Allsvenskan and their 12th consecutive season in the league. The team competed in Allsvenskan, Svenska Cupen and UEFA Europa League.

Season events

Winter
Prior to the start of the season, AIK announced the signing of Jesper Nyholm from Dalkurd on a contract until the end of 2019, and the departure of Niclas Eliasson to IFK Norrköping after they exercised an option in the loan agreement to make the move permanent.

On 1 January, Ahmed Yasin joined Muaither on loan until 31 May.

On 23 January, AIK announced that Alexander Isak had been sold to Borussia Dortmund.

On 25 January, AIK and Jos Hooiveld mutual agreed to end their contract early, with Hooiveld going on to sign for Twente.

On 31 January, AIK announced the signing of Kristoffer Olsson from Midtjylland until the end of 2020, and the departure of Ebenezer Ofori to VfB Stuttgart.

On 4 February, AIK announced the loan signing of Simon Thern from Heerenveen for the season.

On 8 February, AIK announced the loan signing of Stipe Vrdoljak from NK Novigrad until 31 July, with an option to make the transfer permanent.

On 3 March, AIK announced the signing of Sulejman Krpić from Sloboda Tuzla until the end of 2019, and the return of Henok Goitom on a contract until the end of 2018.

On 28 March, Patrick Kpozo joined Tromsø on loan until 20 July, with an option to extend the loan until the end of the season.

Summer
On 30 June, AIK announced that Stipe Vrdoljak's loan had been ended and that they had not taken up the option of making the move permanent, and that they had signed Nicolás Stefanelli from Defensa y Justicia on a contract until 31 December 2020.

On 3 July, AIK announced the signing of Rasmus Lindkvist from Vålerenga on a contract until 31 December 2020. The following day, 4 July, AIK announced the singing of Robert Taylor from RoPS also on a contract until 31 December 2020.

On 7 July, AIK announced that Sulejman Krpić had left the club to return to Sloboda Tuzla.

On 20 July, Sauli Väisänen left AIK to sign for SPAL.

On 26 July, AIK announced the loan signing of Agustin Gómez from Defensa y Justicia for the remainder of the season, and the return of Chinedu Obasi on a contract until the end of the season.

On 4 August, Patrick Kpozo left AIK to join Östersund.

Squad

Transfers

In

Loans in

Out

Loans out

Released

Friendlies

Competitions

Overview

Allsvenskan

League table

Results summary

Results by round

Results

Svenska Cupen

2016–17

Group stage

Knockout phase

2017–18

UEFA Europa League

Qualifying rounds

Squad statistics

Appearances and goals

|-
|colspan="16"|Players away on loan:

|-
|colspan="16"|Players who appeared for AIK but left during the season:

|}

Goal scorers

Clean sheets

Disciplinary record

References

AIK Fotboll season
AIK Fotboll seasons